Northeastern College is a government co-educational secondary school. The school is located in the town of Sangre Grande, on the northeastern side of the island of Trinidad, Trinidad and Tobago.

The school is referred to as a college because it offers seven years (five are to prepare students for Caribbean Examinations Council examinations) of education, of which the last two years (the sixth form) are optional.

Whilst attending Northeastern College, with the exception of mid-term exams and end-of-term exams, there are two to three major exams depending on which year group a student is in. From the third form (year) students are prepared for the National Certificate of Secondary Education exam which is given by the Ministry of Education. The next major exams are CSEC given in the 5th year and CAPE which is given to the year 6 students (these exams are not under the control of the Trinidadian government but instead the examination body Caribbean Examinations Council).

Northeastern College is made up of a student population of approximately 500 males and 600 females.

History

Curriculum
At Northeastern College approximately 30+ subjects are taught, with the majority being available to students after finishing their third year. The subjects can vary between  business subjects, science subjects and general studies. A list of some of the classes available are:

 Additional mathematics                                                                   
 Agricultural science
 Biology
 Building and furniture technology
 Caribbean history
 Chemistry
 Economics
 Electrical and electronic technology
 Electronic document preparation and management
 English language
 English literature
 Geography
 Human and social biology
 Information technology
 Integrated science
 Mathematics
 Mechanical engineering technology
 Music
 Office administration
 Physical education and sport
 Physics
 Principles of accounts
 Principles of business
 Religious instruction (not a subject, only a class)
 Social studies
 Spanish
 Technical drawing
 Theatre arts 
 Visual arts

Extracurricular activities
Extracurricular activities at Northeastern College include basketball, badminton, cricket, dragon boating, football, netball and track and field. The following are a list of other extracurricular activities available at the school:

 Hiking Club
 Environmental Club (C.O.R.E)
 Debate Club
 Drama Club
 Charity Club
 Mathematics Club 
 Science Club
 Astronomy Club
 Cadets Force
 Student Counsel
 School Band
 Becoming a library prefect

Northeastern College was also once known for a vibrant folk choir that won many competitions throughout the country.

House system 
Northeastern College has four houses which are named after hills found within Trinidad:

Aripo (Named after El cerro del Aripo)

Colour: Yellow

Cumberland (Named after Cumberland Hills)

Colour:Red

Tamana (Named after Tamana Hills)

Colour:Green

Trinity(Name after Trinity Hills)

Colour:Blue

Former principals
 Jesslyn Ramlal
 Arthur Antoine
 Annette Brizan
 Lionel Ramoutar
 Mr. Sieunarine
 Lyndon Barath
 Effel Mohammed
 Ralph C. Laltoofounding principal

References

Schools in Trinidad and Tobago
Educational institutions established in 1961